The 1993 Kansas State Wildcats football team represented Kansas State University in the 1993 NCAA Division I-A football season.  The team's head football coach was Bill Snyder.  The Wildcats played their home games in KSU Stadium.  1993 saw the Wildcats finish with a record of 9–2–1, and a 4–2–1 record in Big Eight Conference play.

The 1993 season marked several firsts for the program.  The year ended with a dominant victory against Wyoming in the 1993 Copper Bowl.  This was the program's first bowl appearance since the 1982 Independence Bowl and first bowl win ever.  The 1993 season also marked the first time that Kansas State finished in the final national rankings, and saw the first win over a ranked team in Bill Snyder's career, when No. 25 Kansas State beat No. 13 Oklahoma in Manhattan.

The 1993 season also saw what will likely be the final tie in Kansas State history, as they tied #16 Colorado on October 23. With college football introducing overtime in 1996, a tie is currently impossible under current rules.

1993 was the first year for a new press box on the west side of KSU Stadium.  The press box featured suites and cost $3.3 million to build.  Also, an indoor practice facility was built.

Schedule

Roster

Game summaries

Oklahoma

    
    
    
    

KSU: Schiller 19 Rush, 111 Yds

References

Kansas State
Kansas State Wildcats football seasons
Guaranteed Rate Bowl champion seasons
Kansas State Wildcats football